Daniel Fraser is a British actor. He trained at the Central School of Speech and Drama. He is generally known for playing one of the lead characters in Frequencies (OXV: The Manual), Scar Tissue, The Patrol and Lab Rats. Although a greater part of his acting is done on stage. He also voiced the character of Magnai Oronir in the Stormblood expansion of Final Fantasy XIV.

Filmography

References

External links
 
 

21st-century British male actors
Year of birth missing (living people)
Living people
British male stage actors
British male television actors
British male film actors
Place of birth missing (living people)